The Mossi language (Mooré) is a Gur language of the Oti–Volta branch and one of four official regional languages of Burkina Faso. It is the language of the Mossi people, spoken by approximately 8 million people in Burkina Faso, Ghana, Cote d’Ivoire, Benin, Niger, Mali, Togo and Senegal as a native language, but with many more L2 speakers. Mooré is spoken as a first or second language by over 50% of the Burkinabè population and is the main language in the capital city of Ouagadougou.
It is one of the official regional languages in Burkina Faso and is closely related to Dagbani, with which it is mutually intelligible. Mossi is also known as Mòoré, Mooré, Moré, Moshi, Moore or More.

Phonology 
The Mooré language consists of the following sounds:

Consonants

Remark:
 The semivowel  y is pronounced  (palatal nasal) in front of nasal vowels.

Vowels 

Notes:
 All vowels (oral and nasal) can be short or long.

Orthography 
In Burkina Faso, the Mooré alphabet uses the letters specified in the national Burkinabé alphabet. It can also be written with the newly devised goulsse alphabet.

See also
 Languages of Burkina Faso

References

External links

PanAfrican L10n wiki page on Moore
Database of audio recordings in Mòoré - basic Catholic prayers

Learning materials 

Oti–Volta languages
Languages of Burkina Faso
Languages of Benin
Languages of Ivory Coast
Languages of Ghana
Languages of Mali
Languages of Togo
Mossi people